The 1950 Richmond Spiders football team was an American football team that represented the University of Richmond as a member of the Southern Conference (SoCon) during the 1950 college football season. In their third season under head coach Karl Esleeck, Richmond compiled a 2–8 record, with a mark of 1–8 in conference play, finishing in 16th place in the SoCon.

Schedule

References

Richmond
Richmond Spiders football seasons
Richmond Spiders football